Spyri is a Swiss surname. Notable people with the surname include:

 Emilie Kempin-Spyri (1853–1901), first Swiss female lawyer
 Johanna Spyri (1827–1901), Swiss author

See also
Spyra

Swiss-language surnames